Samhradhán, son of Conchobhar, was the progenitor and chief of the McGovern Clan and Baron or Lord of Tullyhaw barony, County Cavan from  c.1082 to c.1115. The clan is named after him, Mág Samhradháin, meaning the son of Samhradhán.

Ancestry
His ancestry was Samhradhán mac Conchobhar mac Fearghal mac Flann mac Aonghus mac Conchobhar mac Tadhg Tir mac Ruarc mac Íomhaor mac Cosgrach mac Dúnghal mac Oireachtach mac Eochaidh (Teallach n-Eachach or Tullyhaw is named after the latter).

Description
Poem 2, stanza 9, by Giolla Pádraig mac Naimhin, written c.1290-1298, in the Book of Magauran describe Samhradhán as bright and noble.

Residence
Samhradhán lived in Moneensauran townland, Glangevlin, County Cavan. The townland is named after him. There are three medieval ringforts in the townland, one of which was probably his residence. It is thus the cradle of the McGovern clan, where the first McGovern was born, Muireadhach MágSamhradhán.

Family
His son was Muireadhach Mág Samhradhán who ruled from c.1115-c.1148 (i.e. he was the first chief to bear the name Mág Samhradháin or McGovern).

References

Irish lords
People from County Cavan
12th-century Irish people